Dager-Wonsettler Farmstead is a historic building in Glyde, Pennsylvania.  It is designated as a historic residential landmark/farmstead by the Washington County History & Landmarks Foundation.

References

External links
[ National Register nomination form]

Houses on the National Register of Historic Places in Pennsylvania
Houses in Washington County, Pennsylvania
National Register of Historic Places in Washington County, Pennsylvania